Anton Levi Stach (born 15 November 1998) is a German professional footballer who plays as a midfielder for Bundesliga club Mainz 05 and the Germany national team.

Club career
Anton Stach was born in the Lower Saxonian town of Buchholz in der Nordheide near Hamburg and joined Buchholzer FC during his childhood. Since 2010, he has participated to the training at Werder Bremen once a week, before he joined one year later the youth academy (Nachwuchsleistungszentrum) of Bremen-based. Stach has played for Werder Bremen until the B-youth and has played later at JFV Nordwest. Afterwards, he joined the U19-team of VfL Osnabrück.

For the 2017–18 season, the Buchholz-born Stach joined SSV Jeddeloh from Regionalliga Nord, the fourth-highest level in Germany. After a one year, he moved to VfL Wolfsburg and played for the second team of Wolfsburg-based, also in the Regionalliga Nord. With the second team of VfL Wolfsburg, he has reached the play-off round for the promotion to the professional 3. Liga, the third-highest level of German football, but the Lower Saxonians lost against the second team of FC Bayern München.

In the 2020–21 season, Anton Stach left Lower Saxony and joined Franconia-based Greuther Fürth from the second German division, where he signed a contract until summer 2023. Stach helped the team achieve promotion to the Bundesliga. In 2021, he joined Mainz 05 on a deal until summer 2024.

International career
In March 2021, Stach was called up for the Germany national under-21 football team for the group stage of the 2021 UEFA European Under-21 Championship. The matches were broadcast live in Germany at ProSieben and ProSieben MAXX and his father Matthias Stach was the commentator during the group stage. The player was substituted in the second match against the Netherlands and his father has said "Blamier' mich nicht, Junge!" (in English "Don't embarrass me, boy!" or "Don't embarrass me, son!"). Germany advanced past the group stage as Stach made two appearances. In July 2021, he was also a part of the German squad for the knockout stage of the tournament, playing in all three matches as Germany reached the final, where they won 1–0 against Portugal.

Stach was called up to the senior Germany squad for friendly matches against Israel and the Netherlands on 26 and 29 March 2022, respectively. Stach was substituted in the 2–0 win against Israel in Sinsheim in the 64th minute for Julian Weigl.

Personal life 
Anton's father, Matthias Stach, is a sports commentator in Germany. Anton’s sisters, Emma and Lotta, play basketball.

References

External links
 Profile at the 1. FSV Mainz 05 website 
 
 
 
 

1998 births
Living people
People from Harburg (district)
Footballers from Lower Saxony
German footballers
Germany under-21 international footballers
Olympic footballers of Germany
Germany international footballers
Association football midfielders
SSV Jeddeloh players
VfL Wolfsburg II players
SpVgg Greuther Fürth players
1. FSV Mainz 05 players
Bundesliga players
2. Bundesliga players
Regionalliga players
Footballers at the 2020 Summer Olympics